The National Association of Latino Elected and Appointed Officials (NALEO) is the 501(c)(4) nonpartisan leadership organization of the nation's more than 6,700 Latino elected and appointed Latino public officials in the United States. NALEO Educational Fund, founded in 1981, is the 501(c)(3) arm of the organization, with a mission of facilitating full Latino participation in the American political process, from citizenship to public service.

History
Founded in 1976 by U.S. Representative Edward R. Roybal, Harry Pachon, Robert Garcia, and others recognizing the need for a national network of Latino office-holders aimed at bringing together Hispanic and Latino Americans of all national origin groups, political affiliations, and levels of government. On September 29, 1976, the "National Association of Latino Democratic Officials" was incorporated. The group adopted its current name on May 11, 1978, to reflect the nonpartisan nature of the organization.

Congressman Edward R. Roybal served as NALEO president from 1976 to 1991, when the board of directors named him president emeritus.

NALEO develops and implements programs promoting the integration of Latino immigrants into American society, developing future leaders among Latino youth, providing assistance and training to Latino elected and appointed officials and by conducting research on issues important to the Latino population. The organization is a leading advocate for full Latino participation in the decennial census through their Hagase Contar campaign, providing resources and conducting national outreach, marketing, and media campaigns leading up to and during census operations.  

Additionally, NALEO Educational Fund advocates for free and fair access to voting for Latino communities, and is a key member of the New Americans Campaign, a nonpartisan national network of nonprofit organizations committed to connecting lawful permanent residents (LPRs) to trusted legal assistance and critical information that simplifies the naturalization process in the United States.

The organization maintains a headquarters in Los Angeles, California, with primary satellite offices in Washington, D.C. and New York City.

See also
American GI Forum
Congressional Hispanic Caucus
Congressional Hispanic Conference
LNESC
LULAC
NCLR
National Hispanic Leadership Agenda
Republican National Hispanic Assembly

References

External links
 

Professional associations based in the United States
Hispanic and Latino American organizations
Non-profit organizations based in Los Angeles
Organizations established in 1976
1976 establishments in the United States
501(c)(4) nonprofit organizations